Mount Pershing is a 6,154 ft massif in the Olympic Mountains and is located in Mason County of Washington state. It is situated in the Mount Skokomish Wilderness on land managed by Olympic National Forest. The mountain's name honors General of the Armies John J. Pershing (1860–1948). The nearest higher neighbor is Mount Washington,  to the south-southeast. Precipitation runoff drains into the Hamma Hamma River.

Climate

Mount Pershing is located in the marine west coast climate zone of western North America. Most weather fronts originate in the Pacific Ocean, and travel northeast toward the Olympic Mountains. As fronts approach, they are forced upward by the peaks of the Olympic Range, causing them to drop their moisture in the form of rain or snowfall (Orographic lift). As a result, the Olympics experience high precipitation, especially during the winter months. During winter months, weather is usually cloudy, but, due to high pressure systems over the Pacific Ocean that intensify during summer months, there is often little or no cloud cover during the summer. Because of maritime influence, snow tends to be wet and heavy, resulting in high avalanche danger. The months May through August offer the most favorable weather for viewing or climbing this mountain.

Geology

The Olympic Mountains are composed of obducted clastic wedge material and oceanic crust, primarily Eocene sandstone, turbidite, and basaltic oceanic crust. The mountains were sculpted during the Pleistocene era by erosion and glaciers advancing and retreating multiple times.

Gallery

See also

 Olympic Mountains
 Geology of the Pacific Northwest

References

External links

 Weather forecast: Mount Pershing
 Mount Skokomish Wilderness U.S. Forest Service
 Mts. Pershing and Washington photo: Flickr

Olympic Mountains
Landforms of Mason County, Washington
Mountains of Washington (state)
North American 1000 m summits